The Timor yellow tiger (Parantica timorica) is a species of nymphalid butterfly in the subfamily Danainae. It is endemic to Timor, Indonesia.

References

Parantica
Butterflies of Indonesia
Endemic fauna of Indonesia
Taxonomy articles created by Polbot
Butterflies described in 1887